Andreas Treichl (born 16 June 1952, in Vienna) is an Austrian bank manager.

Life 
Treichl attended the Schottengymnasium in Vienna (Upper Secondary School). After completing studies in economics at the University of Vienna, he worked at several branches of Chase Manhattan Bank in a number of European and American cities from 1977 to 1983. From 1983 to 1986, he was a member of the senior management at Erste Bank der oesterreichischen Sparkassen AG. From 1986 to 1993, he served as Chairman of the Board of Chase Manhattan Bank Austria and from 1993 to 1994 as Chairman of the Board of Crédit Lyonnais Austria. In 1997 he became Chairman of the Board of Erste Bank, and since 2008, he has been Chief Executive Officer of Erste Group Bank AG.  The largest shareholder of Erste Group is ERSTE Stiftung of which Andreas Treichl has been Chairman of the Board since the end of 2012. ERSTE Stiftung is one of the largest non-profit organisations in Europe. Its activities focus on the region of Central and Eastern Europe, which is Erste Group’s home market, and include programmes for social integration, culture and Europe. Moreover, Andreas Treichl initiated the project “Die Zweite Sparkasse” and played a key role in its implementation.

Treichl served as finance director of the federal organization of the Austrian People's Party (Österreichische Volkspartei, ÖVP) from 1991 to 1997. He was named Manager of the Year by the Vienna University of Economics on 12 November 2007. Andreas Treichl is a board member of the International Monetary Conference (IMC), of the Institute of International Finance (IIF) and of the Trilateral Commission European Region. In June 2010, he was an invited guest at the 58th Bilderberg Conference in Sitges.

Other activities
 European Council on Foreign Relations (ECFR), Member
 Open Society Foundations, Member of the European Advisory Board

Recognition
 2001: Grand Decoration of Honour in Silver for Services to the Republic of Austria  
 2007: Grand Decoration of Honour in Gold for Services to the Republic of Austria  
 2007: Economic-Manager of the year  
 2012: Grand Order of the Tyrolean Eagle

Personal life
Andreas Treichl is married to Desirée Treichl-Stürgkh and has three sons. Treichl is the son of Heinrich Treichl.

References

External links 

 The Economist Portrait über Andreas Treichl
 Rathauskorrespondenz vom 20. Januar 2005

Austrian bankers
Austrian chief executives
Businesspeople from Vienna
Living people
1952 births